Hypenolobosa is a genus of moths belonging to the family Tortricidae.

Species
Hypenolobosa glechoma Razowski, 1992

See also
List of Tortricidae genera

References

External links

tortricidae.com

Euliini
Tortricidae genera